Abdullah Al-Humayan (born 24 July 1988) is a Saudi professional footballer who plays for Al-Rawdhah as a midfielder.

Career
Al-Humayan began his career with the Al-Rawdhah and spent three years at the club. On 11 July 2011, Al-Humayan joined Al-Jeel. On 24 October 2016, he was suspended for a year and fined 300,000 riyals for manipulating the match against Al-Mujazzal. On 3 September, Al-Humayan joined the newly promoted MS League side Al-Adalah. After only one season with the club, he helped Al-Adalah get promoted to the Pro League for the first time in the club's history. On 9 June 2019, Al-Humayan renewed his contract with Al-Adalah.

References

External links 
 

1988 births
Living people
Saudi Arabian footballers
Al-Rawdhah Club players
Hajer FC players
Al Jeel Club players
Al-Adalah FC players
Association football midfielders
Saudi First Division League players
Saudi Fourth Division players
Saudi Professional League players
Saudi Second Division players